Claudia Belderbos (born 23 January 1985) is a Dutch rower who mostly competes in the eights. She won bronze medals at the 2009 World Championships and 2012 Olympics, placing sixth in 2016. She also collected two silver medals at the European championships in 2015-2016.

Belderbos took up rowing in 2008 and started competing internationally in 2009. She has a degree in child psychology from the Utrecht University.

References

1985 births
Living people
Dutch female rowers
Rowers at the 2012 Summer Olympics
Rowers at the 2016 Summer Olympics
Olympic rowers of the Netherlands
Olympic bronze medalists for the Netherlands
Olympic medalists in rowing
People from Doorn
Medalists at the 2012 Summer Olympics
World Rowing Championships medalists for the Netherlands
European Rowing Championships medalists
20th-century Dutch women
20th-century Dutch people
21st-century Dutch women
Sportspeople from Utrecht (province)